Christian Sebaldt is a German-born cinematographer best known for his work on the long-running CSI: Crime Scene Investigation television series, for which he received a Primetime Emmy Award for Outstanding Cinematography for a Single-Camera Series (One Hour) in 2010. In addition, he has worked on numerous major motion pictures, including Resident Evil: Apocalypse and FeardotCom, and commercials for companies like Toyota and Energizer.

Life & career 
Sebaldt was born and raised in Munich, Germany, his first serious exposure to the film industry was as a trainee at Bavaria Film, a studio in Munich. He spent time in multiple departments, including the visual effects unit, gaining experience that later served him well on effects-heavy projects. His first professional credit was as an on the Rainer Werner Fassbinder film Lili Marleen, where he served as an assistant and cameraman to director of photography Michael Ballhaus.  In 1984, Sebaldt relocated to Los Angeles and began work on numerous projects, including music videos and television commercials. He shot 13 episodes of the Nickelodeon series The Secret World of Alex Mack, and an episode of the documentary series America's Most Wanted. He served as DP for the first two seasons of the crime drama Pacific Blue. Around this time, he became a regular collaborator of director Sean McNamara, shooting films like Galgameth, Casper: A Spirited Beginning, P.U.N.K.S., and Race to Space. In total, he has accumulated over 35 feature film credits.

Since the 2002 direct-to-video science-fiction film Starship Troopers 2: Hero of the Federation, many of Sebaldt's projects have been filmed on digital video rather than film. He applied this style of dark, gritty photography onto films like Resident Evil: Apocalypse and FeardotCom, and on television series like CSI: Crime Scene Investigation, for which he received a Primetime Emmy Award for Outstanding Cinematography for a Single-Camera Series and a Kodak Vision Award, as well as a nomination for an ASC Award. His most recent project has been the dark fantasy series Lucifer.

Personal life 
Sebaldt is a member of the American Society of Cinematographers, the Academy of Motion Picture Arts and Sciences, the Academy of Television Arts & Sciences, and the Visual Effects Society, among others. He has been married since 2001 to script supervisor Mary Anne Seward, with whom he has had one child.

Christian currently lives in Los Angeles, California.

Selected filmography

Film 

 Bloodfist IV: Die Trying (1992)
 Revenge of the Red Baron (1994)
 Caroline at Midnight (1994)
 Galgameth (1996)
 Casper: A Spirited Beginning (1997)                                                                   
 Casper Meets Wendy (1998)                                                                   
 Richie Rich's Christmas Wish (1998)
 P.U.N.K.S. (1999)
 Race to Space (2001)
 FeardotCom (2002)
 Resident Evil: Apocalypse (2004)
 The Dark (2005)
 Crossover (2006)
 Bratz (2007)
 Parasomnia (2008)
 Robosapien: Rebooted (2013)
 On a Wing and a Prayer (2023)
 Reagan (2023)

Television 

 The Secret World of Alex Mack (1994-1995) - 13 episodes
 America's Most Wanted (1995) - 1 episode
 Pacific Blue (1996-1997) - 31 episodes
 Addams Family Reunion (1998) - Television film
 Time Share (1999) - Television film
 The Brothers García (2000) - 1 episode
 The Even Stevens Movie (2003) - Television film
 Starship Troopers 2: Hero of the Federation (2004) - Television film
 Species III (2004) - Television film
 Phil of the Future (2004) - 1 episode
 On the Lot (2007) - 3 episodes
 CSI: Crime Scene Investigation (2008-2015) - 74 episodes
 Rush Hour (2016) - 6 episodes
 Lucifer (2017)

References

External links 

German cinematographers
Living people
German expatriates in the United States
Year of birth missing (living people)
Mass media people from Munich